The Mommsen family is a German family of influential historians.

Jens Mommsen (1783–1851) ∞ Sophie Elisabeth Krumbhaar (1792–1855)
Theodor Mommsen (1817-1903), 1902 Nobel Laureate in Literature ∞ Marie Reimer (1832–1907)
Marie Mommsen (1855–1936) ∞ Ulrich von Wilamowitz-Moellendorff (1848–1931)
Karl Mommsen (1861–1922)
Wilhelm Mommsen (1892–1966)
Wolfgang Mommsen (1930–2004) ∞ Sabine von Schalburg, other
Hans Mommsen (1930-2015) ∞ Margaretha Reindl
Ernst Mommsen (1863–1930) ∞ Klara Weber (1875–1953)
Theodor Ernst Mommsen (1905–1958)
Ernst Wolf Mommsen (1910–1979)
Hans Georg Mommsen (1873–1941)
Wolfgang A. Mommsen (1907–1986) ∞ Ingeborg Mend (1921–1992)
Tycho Mommsen (1819–1900) ∞ Franziska de Boor (1824–1902)
August Mommsen (1821–1913)

Further reading
 Köpf, Peter (2004). Die Mommsens. Von 1848 bis heute - die Geschichte einer Familie ist die Geschichte der Deutschen, Hamburg: Europa-Verlag. 

German families
Burials at Frankfurt Main Cemetery